WINLAB is the Wireless Information Network Laboratory, a research laboratory at Rutgers University, that is dedicated to research in a number of disciplines related to wireless communications. It consists of a number of faculty members from the Computer Science and Electrical & Computer Engineering departments at Rutgers University and research scientists. It is housed on a separate facility, away from the main engineering campus of Rutgers University (Busch Campus). The lab is famous for a pioneering early work during the development of cellular networks. It also houses the ORBIT testbed, the largest indoor wireless testbed of its kind in the world, housing more than 1200 radio nodes in a single room. The laboratory has approximately 40 PhD students, 20 MS students, and 2 Undergraduate students advised by approximately 20 full-time professors. WINLAB is funded by grants from its industry sponsors, the National Science Foundation, as well as Rutgers University and other agencies.

Evolution of Research in WINLAB
WINLAB was founded by Prof. David Goodman in 1989 as an industry-university cooperative research center focusing on wireless technology. During the founding years of WINLAB, analog cellular telephony was the leading technology in the market. The research addressed fundamental issues in mobility due to switching, signaling and effects of power control and coding in CDMA systems. WINLAB researchers were one of the earliest to work on issues related to packet transmission in  cellular wireless networks. Over the years, research in WINLAB has evolved to meet the challenges in wireless, in both theoretical and practical aspects. The research projects in WINLAB are mainly driven by sponsors companies and the wireless industry in general. In the year 2001, Prof. Dipankar Raychaudhuri took over as the director of WINLAB.

Industry Advisory Board research reviews
The Industry Advisory Board (IAB) research reviews are a regular bi-annual feature in WINLAB research schedule. Each research review session is based on a theme of research. WINLAB faculty and students showcase their work in these meetings. The program includes overview talks, guest lectures, student talks, demonstrations and poster sessions. The sponsor companies are given status updates on the various research projects going on in WINLAB.

References

External links
Official website
Rutgers University, Electrical and Computer Engineering Department (ECE)
Rutgers University, Computer Science Department (CS)

Rutgers University
University and college laboratories in the United States
Wireless
Wireless network organizations